Elections to the Portuguese National Assembly were held in Angola in 1957 as part of the wider Portuguese elections.

Electoral system
The franchise was restricted, with only 56,108 of the population of approximately 4,335,000 registered to vote.

Results
A total of 49,084 voters participated in the election, giving a voter turnout of 87.5%.

References

1957 elections in Africa
1957 in Angola
1957
1957